The Ella Armitage Building, formerly known as the Sheffield Bioincubator is a former innovation centre in Sheffield, England. It contained offices and laboratories for small and medium enterprises in emerging technology and related areas and with links to the University of Sheffield.  The building is owned, managed and run by the University of Sheffield.  The building was closed to commercial activity in 2017 and was incorporated into the University of Sheffield's teaching and research space and renamed the Ella Armitage Building. The building houses the modern languages teaching centre, Grantham Centre and the Department of Archeology.

History 
The Bioincubator was opened in February 2006 by Lord Sainsbury as a focus for Bioscience and Technology entrepreneurship in the Sheffield City Region. It was funded by the European Regional Development Fund, Sheffield University and Yorkshire Forward. The development was intended to assist the growth of an emerging technology and bioscience cluster in the Sheffield City Region. It provided a physical space for partners to work with the University of Sheffield, a Russell Group research institution. In 2007 its partner building the Kroto Innovation Centre was opened.

Notable partnerships
The concept of using Electrical impedance spectroscopy to detect oral cancer was found to have positive results through preliminary testing. It was presented to the Annual Meeting of the American Academy of Oral Medicine in 2013 by Professor Martin Thornhill from Sheffield University. The concept was the outcome of a research collaboration between commercial Bioincubator tenant Zilico, Sheffield University and the Sheffield Teaching Hospitals NHS Foundation Trust.

See also
 Bioincubator
 Kroto Innovation Centre

References

Sheffield University buildings and structures
Business incubators of the United Kingdom
Buildings and structures completed in 2004